Phytophthora phaseoli is a plant pathogen which infects lima bean (Phaseolus lunatus) and has no other known hosts.

References

phaseoli
Water mould plant pathogens and diseases
Vegetable diseases